Maria Clotilde Troili a/k/a Jenny Luna (born 27 March 1931, Rome, Italy), is an Italian singer who was popular in the 1960s and 1970s.

References

1931 births
Living people
20th-century Italian women singers
Singers from Rome